Lakrea Merie Clark (born October 19, 1991, in Austin, Texas) is an American R&B and jazz singer-songwriter who also goes by the stage name Lakrea.

Biography
Lakrea Clark began performing at the age of three in her family's church and wrote her first song at the age of eight. However, Lakrea began singing professionally at the age of thirteen. She has performed at various venues across Texas, as well as at the MGM Grand and Showtime at the Apollo.
Currently, Lakrea is being managed by her father, Darren.
On February 20, 2006, she released her debut album, Southern Girl independently.
Currently, she is in the works of being signed to No Limit Records.
However, it has not been finalized. She currently has a second album in the works.

Discography

Albums

Singles
"We Can Do It" (Featuring Jamale)
"So Tired"

External links
 
Official website

References

1991 births
21st-century American singers
21st-century African-American women singers
American child singers
American rhythm and blues singers
Living people
Musicians from Austin, Texas
Singers from Texas
21st-century American women singers